Robert Doisneau (14 April 1912 – 1 April 1994) was a French photographer. From the 1930s, he photographed the streets of Paris. He was a champion of humanist photography and with Henri Cartier-Bresson a pioneer of photojournalism.

Doisneau is known for his 1950 image Le baiser de l'hôtel de ville (The Kiss by the City Hall), a photograph of a couple kissing on a busy Parisian street.

He was appointed a Chevalier (Knight) of the Legion of Honour in 1984 by then French president, François Mitterrand.

Photographic career
Doisneau is remembered for his modest, playful, and ironic images of amusing juxtapositions, mingling social classes, and eccentrics in contemporary Paris streets and cafes. Influenced by the work of André Kertész, Eugène Atget, and Henri Cartier-Bresson, in more than twenty books of photography, he presented a charming vision of human frailty and life as a series of quiet, incongruous moments.

Doisneau's work gives unusual prominence and dignity to children's street culture; returning again and again to the theme of children at play in the city, unfettered by parents. His work treats their play with seriousness and respect.

Early life
Doisneau's father, a plumber, died on active service in World War I, when his son was about four. His mother died when he was seven. He then was raised by an aunt. At thirteen, he enrolled at the École Estienne, a craft school from which he graduated in 1929 with diplomas in engraving and lithography. There he had his first contact with the arts, taking classes in figure drawing and still life.

When he was 16, he took up amateur photography, but was reportedly so shy that he started by photographing cobble-stones before progressing to children and then adults.

At the end of the 1920s, Doisneau found work as a draughtsman (lettering artist) in the advertising industry at Atelier Ullmann (Ullmann Studio), a creative graphics studio that specialised in the pharmaceutical industry. Here he took an opportunity to change career by also acting as camera assistant in the studio and then becoming a staff photographer.

Photography in the 1930s
In 1931, he left both the studio and advertising, taking a job as an assistant with the modernist photographer André Vigneau. In 1932, he sold his first photographic story to Excelsior magazine.

In 1934, he began working as an industrial advertising photographer for the Renault car factory at Boulogne-Billancourt. Working at Renault increased Doisneau's interest in working with photography and people. Five years later, in 1939, he was dismissed because he was constantly late. He was forced to try freelance advertising, engraving, and postcard photography to earn his living. At that time, the French postcard industry was the largest in Europe, postcards served as greetings cards as well as vacation souvenirs. In 1991, he said that the years at the Renault car factory marked "the beginning of his career as a photographer and the end of his youth."

In 1939, he was later hired by Charles Rado of the Rapho photographic agency and traveled throughout France in search of picture stories. This is where he took his first professional street photographs.

War service and resistance
Doisneau worked at the Rapho agency until the outbreak of World War II, whereupon he was drafted into the French army as both a soldier and photographer. He was in the army until 1940 and, from then until the end of the war in 1945, used his draughtsmanship, lettering artistry, and engraving skills to forge passports and identification papers for the French Resistance.

Post-war photography

Some of Doisneau's most memorable photographs were taken after the war. He returned to freelance photography and sold photographs to Life and other international magazines. He briefly joined the Alliance Photo Agency but rejoined the Rapho agency in 1946 and remained with them throughout his working life, despite receiving an invitation from Henri Cartier-Bresson to join Magnum Photos.

His photographs never ridiculed the subjects; thus he refused to photograph women whose heads had been shaved as punishment for sleeping with Germans.

In 1948, he was contracted by Vogue to work as a fashion photographer. The editors believed he would bring a fresh and more casual look the magazine but Doisneau did not enjoy photographing beautiful women in elegant surroundings; he preferred street photography. When he could escape from the studio, he photographed in the Paris streets.

Le Groupe des XV was established in 1946 in Paris to promote photography as art and drawing attention to the preservation of French photographic heritage, and Doisneau joined in 1950 and participated alongside Rene-Jacques, Willy Ronis, and Pierre Jahan. After the group was disbanded, he joined the less exclusive and more militant Les 30 x 40, the Club Photographique de Paris.

The 1950s were Doisneau's peak, but the 1960s were his wilderness years. In the 1970s, Europe began to change and editors looked for new reportage that would show the sense of a new social era. All over Europe, the old-style picture magazines were closing as television gained the public's attention. Doisneau continued to work, producing children's books, advertising photography, and celebrity portraits including Alberto Giacometti, Jean Cocteau, Fernand Léger, Georges Braque, and Pablo Picasso.

Doisneau worked with writers and poets such as Blaise Cendrars and Jacques Prévert, and he credited Prevert with giving him the confidence to photograph the everyday street scenes that most people simply ignored.

The photography of Doisneau has had a revival since his death in 1994. Many of his portraits and photographs of Paris from the end of World War II through the 1950s have been turned into calendars and postcards, and have become icons of French life.

Le Baiser de l'hôtel de ville (The Kiss) 
In 1950 Doisneau created his most recognizable work for Life –  (Kiss by the Hôtel de Ville), a photograph of a couple kissing in the busy streets of Paris, which became an internationally recognised symbol of young love in Paris. The identity of the couple remained a mystery until 1992.

Jean and Denise Lavergne erroneously believed themselves to be the couple in The Kiss, and when Robert and Annette Doisneau (his older daughter and also his assistant at the time) met them for lunch in the 1980s he "did not want to shatter their dream" so he said nothing. This resulted in them taking him to court for "taking their picture without their knowledge", because under French law an individual owns the rights to their own likeness. The court action forced Doisneau to reveal that he posed the shot using Françoise Delbart and Jacques Carteaud, lovers whom he had just seen kissing, but had not photographed initially because of his natural reserve; he approached them and asked if they would repeat the kiss. He won the court case against the Lavergnes. Doisneau said in 1992: "I would never have dared to photograph people like that. Lovers kissing in the street, those couples are rarely legitimate."

The couple in Le baiser were Françoise Delbart, 20, and Jacques Carteaud, 23, both aspiring actors. In 2005, Françoise Bornet (née Delbart) stated: "He told us we were charming, and asked if we could kiss again for the camera. We didn't mind. We were used to kissing. We were doing it all the time then, it was delicious. Monsieur Doisneau was adorable, very low key, very relaxed." They posed at the Place de la Concorde, the Rue de Rivoli and finally the Hôtel de Ville. The photograph was published on 12 June 1950, issue of Life. The relationship between Delbart and Carteaud only lasted for nine months. Delbart continued her acting career, but Carteaud gave up acting to become a wine producer.

In 1950, Françoise Bornet was given an original print of the photograph, bearing Doisneau's signature and stamp, as part of the payment for her "work". In April 2005, she sold the print at auction for €155,000 to an unidentified Swiss collector via the Paris auctioneers Artcurial Briest-Poulain-Le Fur.

Personal life
In 1936, Doisneau married Pierrette Chaumaison whom he had met in 1934 when she was cycling through a village where he was on holiday. The couple had two daughters, Annette (b. 1942) and Francine (b. 1947). From 1979 until his death, Annette worked as his assistant.

His wife died in 1993 suffering from Alzheimer's disease and Parkinson's disease. Doisneau died six months later in 1994, having had a triple heart bypass and was  suffering from acute pancreatitis. Annette said: "We won in the courts (re: The Kiss), but my father was deeply shocked. He discovered a world of lies, and it hurt him. The Kiss ruined the last years of his life. Add that to my mother suffering from Alzheimer's and Parkinson's, and I think it's fair to say he died of sadness."

Doisneau was in many ways a shy and humble man, similar to his photography, still delivering his own work at the height of his fame. He chastised Francine for charging an "indecent" daily fee of £2,000 for his work on a beer advertising campaign – he wanted only the rate of an "artisan photographer".

He lived in southern Paris (Gentilly, Val-de-Marne, Montrouge, and the 13th arrondissement) throughout his life. He is buried in the cemetery at Raizeux beside his wife.

Awards and commemoration

 Kodak Prize, 1947
 Niépce Prize, 1956 (Nicéphore Niépce)
 Grand Prix National de la Photographie, 1983
 Balzac Prize, 1986 (Honoré de Balzac)
 Chevalier of the Order of the Legion of Honour, 1984.
 Honorary Fellowship (HonFRPS) from the Royal Photographic Society, 1991.
 The Maison de la photographie Robert Doisneau in Gentilly, Val-de-Marne, is a photography gallery named in his honour.
 Several Ecole Primaire (primary schools) are named after him. Ecole élémentaire Robert Doisneau is at Véretz (Indre-et-Loire).
 The Allée Robert Doisneau is named in his honour at the 'Parc de Billancourt' on the site of the old Renault factory at Boulogne-Billancourt.
 On 14 April 2012, Google celebrated his 100th birthday with a Google Doodle.

Publications
 Paris délivré par son peuple. (From the People of Paris). Paris: Braun: c.1944.
 La Banlieue de Paris. (The Suburbs of Paris). Text by Blaise Cendrars. Paris: Éditions Pierre Seghers, 1949.
 L'Enfant de Paris. (The Children of Paris).  Text by Claude Roy. Neuchâtel: La Baconnière, 1951.
 Sortilèges de Paris. (The magic of Paris).  Text by François Cali. Paris: Arthaud, 1952.
 Les Parisiens tels qu’ils sont. (The Parisians as they are.).  Text by Robert Giraud and Michel Ragon. Paris: Delpire, 1954.
 Instantanés de Paris. (Snapshots of Paris). Preface by Blaise Cendrars. Paris: Arthaud, 1955.
 1, 2, 3, 4, 5, Compter en s’amusant. (Fun Counting). Lausanne: La Guilde du Livre, 1955.
 1, 2, 3, 4, 5.. Text by Arthur Gregor. Philadelphia: Lippincott, 1956.
 1, 2, 3, 4, 5.. Text by Elsie May Harris. London: Nelson, 1962.
 Pour que Paris soit. (This is Paris). Text by Elsa Triolet. Paris: Éditions Cercle d’Art, 1956.
 Gosses de Paris. (Children of Paris). Text by Jean Dongués. Paris: Éditions Jeheber, 1956.
 Robert Doisneau's Paris: 148 Photographs. Text by Blaise Cendrars. New York: Simon & Schuster, 1956.
 Paris Parade: 148 Photographs. London: Thames & Hudson, 1956.
 Le ballet contre l'opéra. (The Ballet and The Opera). Souillac, Lot: Mulhouse, 1956.
 A.B.C. du dépannage.. N.p.: Société des pétroles Shell Berre, 1958.
 Bistrots. (Bistros). Text by Robert Giraud. Le Point: Revue artistique et littéraire, 57. Souillac, Lot: Mulhouse, 1960.
 Arabie, carrefour des siècles: Album. (Arabia, crossroads of the centuries. An album). Text by Jacques Benoist-Méchin. Lausanne: La Guilde du livre, 1961.
 Nicolas Schöffer.. Text by Guy Habasque and Jacques Ménétrier. Neuchâtel: Éditions du Griffon, 1962.
 Cognac.. Text by Georges Vial. Cognac: Rémy Martin, 1960 (?). 
 Cognac.. Text by Louise de Vilmorin. Paris: Rémy Martin, 1962. 
 Marius, le forestier. (Marius, the forester. The working men). Text by Dominique Halévy. Les hommes travaillent. Paris: Éditions Fernand Nathan, 1964.
 Henri Cartier-Bresson, Robert Doisneau, André Vigneau: Trois photographes français. Arles: Musée Réattu, 1965.
 Catalogue of an exhibition at Musée Réattu of Doisneau, Henri Cartier-Bresson, and André Vigneau.
 Épouvantables Épouvantails. (Appalling Scarecrows). Paris: Éditions Hors Mesure, 1965.
 Le Royaume d’argot. (The Kingdom of slang). Text by Robert Giraud. Paris: Denoël, 1966.
 Catherine la danseuse. (Catherine. the dancer). Text by Michèle Manceaux. Paris: Éditions Fernand Nathan, 1966.
 L'École polytechnique. (The Polytechnic). Loos-lez-Lille: L. Danel, 1967.
 L'Oeil objectif. (The eye is a lens). Marseille: Musée Cantini, 1968.
 Catalogue of an exhibition at Musée Cantini by Doisneau, Denis Brihat, Lucien Clergue, and Jean-Pierre Sudre.
 Le Royaume secret du milieu. (The secret of the middle kingdom). Text by Robert Giraud. Paris: Éditions Planète, 1969.
 My Paris. Text by Chevalier, Maurice. Macmillan Publishers. New York. 1972
 Le Paris de Robert Doisneau et Max-Pol Fouchet. Les éditeurs français réunis. France. 1974
 L’Enfant à la Colombe. (The Child of the Dove). Text by Sage, James. Editions of the Oak. Paris. La Loire. Denoël. Paris. 1978
 Le Mal de Paris. (The Evil of Paris). Text by Lépidis, Clément. Arthaud Publications. Paris. Trois Secondes d’éternité. Contrejour. Paris. 1979
 Ballade pour Violoncelle et Chambre Noir. (A Song for a Cello and a dark room). co-author: Baquet, Maurice. Herscher Editions. Paris. 1980
 Robert Doisneau. Text by Chevrier, Jean-François. Belfond Editions. Paris. 1981
 Passages et Galeries du 19ème Siècle. (Passages and Galleries of the 19th Century). Text by Delvaille, Bernard. Éditions Balland. Paris. 1982
 Doisneau. Photopoche, Centre national de la photographie. France. 1983
 Paysages, Photographies. (Landscapes). (mission photography for DATAR) Éditions Hazan. Paris. 1985
 Un Certain Robert Doisneau. Editions of the Oak. Paris. 1986
 Pour saluer Cendrars. (In honour of Cendrars). Text by Camilly, J. Actes Sud. Arles, France. 1987
 60 portraits d/artists. (60 portraits of artists). Text by Petit, Jean. Hans Grieshaber Publications. Zürich. 1988
 Doisneau. Quotations by Doisneau collected by Maisonneuve Andre. Éditions Hazan. Paris, France. 1988
 Bonjour Monsieur Le Corbusier. (Hello Mr Le Corbusier). Text by Petit, Jean. Hans Grieshaber Publications. Zürich. 1988
 A l’imparfait de l’objectif. (The imperfect object). Belfond Editions. Paris. 1989
 Les Doigts Pleins d’encre. (Fingers full of ink). Text by Cavanna. Hoëbeke Editions. Paris. 1989
 La Science de Doisneau. (The Science of Robert Doisneau). Hoëbeke Editions. Paris. 1990
 Les Auvergnats. (People of the Auvergne). With Dubois, Jaques. Nathan Images. Paris. 1990
 Lettres à un Aveugle sur des Photographies de Robert Doisneau. (Letters to a blind man about the Photographs of Robert Doisneau). Text by Roumette, Sylvain. 1990
 Le Tout sur le tout/Le Temps qu’il fait. (All about the weather). Paris. 1990
 Le Vin des rues. Text by Robert Giraud. Paris: Denoël, 1990.
 Rue Jacques Prévert. Hoëbeke Editions. Paris, France. 1991
 La Compagnie des Zincs. Text by Carradec, François Carradec. Seghers. Paris. 1991
 Les Grandes Vacances. (Summer vacation). Text by Pennac, Daniel. Hoëbeke Editions. Paris. 1992
 Mes gens de Plume. Writings by Doisneau collected by Dubois, Y. Éditions La Martinière. France. 1992
 Les Enfants de Germinal. (The children of Germinal). Text by Cavanna. Hoëbeke Editions. Paris. 1993 (See also Germinal (month). the downfall)
 Doisneau 40/44. Text by Ory, Pascal. Hoëbeke Editions. Paris. 1994
 La Vie de Famille. (Family life). Text by Ory, Pascal. Hoëbeke Editions. Paris. 1994
 Robert Doisneau ou la Vie d’un photographie. (Robert Doisneau. the life of a photographer. Text by Hamilton, Peter. Hoëbeke Editions. Paris. 1995
 Mes Parisiens. (My Parisians). Nathan Publications. Paris. 1997
 Palm Springs 1960. Paris: Flammarion, 2010. . With a foreword by Jean-Paul Dubois.
 Robert Doisneau, comme un barbare. Text by André Pozner. Paris: Lux Editions, 2012. .

Exhibitions

 1947 Salon de la Photo, Bibliothèque, Paris
 1951 Exhibition with Brassaї, Willy Ronis, and Izis, Museum of Modern Art, New York
 1960 Solo exhibition, Museum of Modern Art, Chicago.
 1965 Exhibition with Daniel Frasnay, Jean Lattès, Jeanine Niépce, Roger Pic, and Willy Ronis, Six Photographes et Paris, Musée des Arts Decoratifs, Paris; Exhibition with Henri Cartier-Bresson and André Vigneau, Musée Réattu, Arles; Solo Exhibition, Bibliothèque Nationale, Paris; Exhibition with D. Brihat, J. P. Sudre, and L. Clergue, Musée Cantini de Marseilles
 1972 Solo Exhibition, International Museum of Photography at George Eastman House, Rochester, New York
 1972 Exhibition with Edouard Boubat, Brassaї, Henri Cartier-Bresson, Izis, and Willy Ronis, French Embassy, Moscow
 1974 Solo Exhibition, University of California at Davis. Solo exhibition, Galerie du Château d’Eau, Toulouse
 1975 Solo Exhibition, Witkin Gallery, New York; Musée Réattu Arts Décoratifs, Nantes; Musée Réattu, Arles
 1975 Solo exhibition, Galerie et Fils, Brussels. Solo exhibition, fnac, Lyons; Group exhibition, Expression de l’humor, Boulogne Billancourt; Solo exhibition, Galerie Neugebauer, Basel
 1976 Exhibition with Brassaї, Cartier-Bresson, Jean-Philippe Charbonnier, Izis, and Marc Riboud, Kraków
 1977 Solo Exhibition, Brussels; Exhibition with Guy la Querrec, Carlos Freire, Claude Raimond-Dityvon, Bernard Descamps, and Jean Lattès, Six Photographes en quête de banlieue, Centre Georges Pompidou, Paris
 1978 Solo Exhibition, Ne Bougeons plus, Galerie Agathe Gaillard, Paris; Solo exhibition, Witkin Gallery, New York; Solo exhibition, Musée Nicéphore Niépce, Charlon-sur-Saône
 1979 Solo Exhibition, Paris, les passants qui passent, Musée d’Art Moderne de la Ville de Paris
 1980 Solo Exhibition, Amsterdam
 1981 Solo Exhibition, Witkin Gallery, New York
 1982 Solo Exhibition, Portraits, Foundation Nationale de la Photographie, Lyons; Solo exhibition, French Embassy, New York; Solo exhibition, Robert Doisneau, Photographe de banlieue, Town Hall, Gentilly
 1982 Solo exhibition of 120 photographs, Palace of Fine Arts, Beijing, Exhibition of portraits, Tokyo; Solo exhibition, Robert Doisneau, Photographie du dimanche, Institut Lumière, Lyon
 1986 Group Exhibition, De Vogue à femme, Rencontres Internationales de la Photographie d’Arles
 1987 Solo Exhibition, St.-Denis, Musée de St.-Denis; Solo exhibition, The National Museum of Modern Art, Kyoto
 1988 Solo Exhibition, A Homage to Robert Doisneau, Villa Medicis, Rome
 1989 Solo Exhibition, Doisneau-Renault, Grande Halle de la Villette, Paris
 1990 Solo Exhibition, La Science de Doisneau, Jardin des Plantes, Paris
 1992 Solo Exhibition, Robert Doisneau: A Retrospective, Modern Art Oxford
 1993 The Summerlee Heritage Trust, Coatbridge, Scotland; Royal Festival Hall, London; Manchester City Art Gallery; O Mes da Fotografie Festival, Convento do Beato, Lisbon, Portugal; Musée Carnavalet, Paris
 1994 "Hommage à Robert Doisneau", festival des Rencontres d'Arles, France
 1994 Musée d’Art Contemporain de Montréal, Canada; Galway Arts Centre, Ireland; Solo exhibition, A Homage to Robert Doisneau, Galerie du Château d’Eau à Toulouse; Solo exhibition, Doisneau 40/44, Centre d’Histoire de la Résistance et de la Déportation de Lyon, Lyon, France; Solo exhibition, Robert Doisneau ou la désobéissance, Ecomusée de Fresnais
 1995 Museum of Modern Art, Oxford, England; Aberdeen Art Gallery, Scotland; The Mead Gallery, Warwick Arts Centre, Coventry
 1996 Solo Exhibition, Montpellier Photo-Visions, Galerie Municipale de la Photographie; Isetan Museum of Art, Tokyo; Daimaru Museum, Osaka, Japan
 2000 Exhibition, Gravités, Paris
 2000 Exhibition, Galerie Claude Bernard, Paris 
 2002 Exhibition, Museo Nacional de Bellas Artes, Santiago, Chile
 2003 Exhibition, Budapest, Hungary; Exhibition, Bucarest, Romania
 2003 Exhibition, Galerie Claude Bernard, Paris
 2005 Solo Exhibition, Robert Doisneau from the Fictional to the Real, Bruce Silverstein Gallery, New York
 2005 Solo Exhibition, Robert Doisneau, Galerie Claude Bernard, Paris
 2010 Solo Exhibitions, Robert Doisneau, Du metier a l'oeuvre, Fondation Henri Cartier-Bresson, 2, Impasse Lebouis, 75014 Paris
 2010 Group Exhibition, Discoveries, Robert Doisneau, Bruce Silverstein Gallery, New York
 2010 Solo Exhibition, Robert Doisneau, the fisherman of images, the Space for Art of Caja Madrid Zaragoza, Aranjuez, Madrid
 2011 Group exhibition: Night, Robert Doisneau Bruce Silverstein Gallery, New York 
 2014 exhibition : The moments that he loved, sangsangmadang, Seoul
 2015 exhibition : Robert Doisneau, a photographer at the museum, Grande Galerie de l'Évolution, Paris

Films about Doisneau
A short film, Le Paris de Robert Doisneau, was made in 1973.

In 1992 the French actress and producer Sabine Azéma made the film Bonjour Monsieur Doisneau.

References

External links

 
 Encyclopædia Britannica, Robert Doisneau
 Maison de la Photographie Robert-Doisneau
 BBC News report on the auction of Le baiser de l'hôtel de ville
 Robert Doisneau: Seconds Snatched from Eternity

1912 births
1994 deaths
Chevaliers of the Légion d'honneur
French photographers
People from Val-de-Marne
Street photographers
Humanist photographers
Cooperatives in France